Kharitonovo is a rural locality (a selo) and the administrative center of Kharitonovsky Selsoviet of Zavyalovsky District, Altai Krai, Russia. The population was 1048 as of 2016. There are 11 streets.

Geography 
Kharitonovo is located in the Kulunda Plain, on the east bank of the Mostovoye Lake, 33 km north of Zavyalovo (the district's administrative centre) by road. Malinovsky is the nearest rural locality.

Ethnicity 
The village is inhabited by Russians and others.

References 

Rural localities in Zavyalovsky District, Altai Krai